The Belgian State Railways Type 29 was a class of  steam locomotives for freight service, introduced in 1875.

Construction history
The locomotives were built in two main series, the first series from 1875 to 1884 and the second from 1898 to 1901.
The later machines differed by the dimensions of the boiler, the shelter, suspension and appearance of the smoke box.

The Type 29 was very similar to the Type 28, from which it differed mainly in the diameter of the wheels (1.30 m instead of 1.45 m) and some details of the chassis.

The machines used a Belpaire firebox and had an outside frame with the cylinders and the Stephenson valve gear located inside the frame.

References

Bibliography

0-6-0 locomotives
Steam locomotives of Belgium
Standard gauge locomotives of Belgium
C n2 locomotives
Railway locomotives introduced in 1875
Cockerill locomotives
Franco-Belge locomotives